Frank Tallis (born 1 September 1958) is an English author and clinical psychologist, whose area of expertise is obsessive-compulsive disorder (OCD). He has written crime novels, including the collection of novels known as the Liebermann Papers, for which he has received several awards, is an essayist, and – under the name of F.R. Tallis — has written horror fiction. The Lieberman novels have been adapted by Stephen Thompson into the BBC TV series Vienna Blood, which first aired in 2019.

Early life
Frank Tallis was born Francesco de Nato Napolitano  in Stoke Newington in northeast London and grew up in Tottenham, a district characterised by ethnic diversity and social tensions, where he attended one of the former secondary modern schools, and describes his background as "100% Southern Italian". After he left school he initially lived an unsteady life, teaching piano and playing in a rock band. Then he married, and lived in the country for a while with his wife and their child.

Psychologist
After he and his wife divorced he earned a doctorate in psychology and worked for the British National Health Service for a long time, taught clinical psychology and neuroscience at King's College London, and treated private patients. Tallis has been a full-time writer since the late 2000s and lives in London.

Writing

Tallis has published more than 30 articles in psychology and psychiatry journals. He has written four popular science books on psychology, drawing on anonymized case studies from his therapeutic practice, including The Incurable Romantic and Other Unsettling Revelations, in which he deals with the phenomenon of obsessive love. 
Since 2005, Tallis has been writing crime novels, published under the rubric of the Liebermann Papers and set in Vienna around the beginning of the 20th century. The two main characters are Vienna police inspector Oskar Reinhardt and his friend and adviser, psychiatrist Max Liebermann, a student of Sigmund Freud and a regular guest at Freud's apartment at Berggasse 19, now the Sigmund Freud Museum in Vienna.

Bibliography

Non-fiction
 1990: How to Stop Worrying, Sheldon (London), 
 1992: Understanding Obsessions and Compulsions: A Self- Help Manual, Sheldon (London), 
 1994: Worrying: Perspectives on Theory, Assessment, and Treatment (co-editor with Graham C. Davey), Wiley (New York), 
 1994: Coping with Schizophrenia (co-author with Steven Jones), Sheldon (London), 
 1995: Obsessive Compulsive Disorder: A Cognitive and Neuropsychological Perspective, Wiley (New York), 
 1998: Changing Minds: The History of Psychotherapy as an Answer to Human Suffering, Cassell (New York), 
 2002: Hidden Minds: A History of the Unconscious, Arcade Publishing (New York), 
 2005: Love Sick: Love as a Mental Illness, Da Capo Books, 
 2015: The Sheldon Short Guide to Worry and Anxiety, SPCK, 
 2019: The Incurable Romantic and Other Unsettling Revelations, Abacus, 
 2020: The Act of Living: What the Great Psychologists Can Teach Us About Finding Fulfillment, Basic Books,

Crime fiction

Max Liebermann mysteries
 2005: Mortal Mischief: (Liebermann Papers 1), Arrow Books, ; U.S. title: A Death in Vienna, Random House, 
 2006: Vienna Blood: (Liebermann Papers 2), Arrow Books, 
 2008: Fatal Lies: (Liebermann Papers 3), Century, 
 2009: Darkness Rising: (Liebermann Papers 4), Century, ; U.S. title: Vienna Secrets, Random House, 
 2010: Deadly Communion: (Liebermann Papers 5), Arrow Books, ; U.S. title: Vienna Twilight, Random House, 
 2011: Death and the Maiden: (Liebermann Papers 6), Arrow Books, 
 2018: Mephisto Waltz, Pegasus Books,

Horror fiction

Writing as F.R. Tallis 
 2014: The Voices, Pan, 
 2016: The Forbidden, Pan, 
 2017: The Sleep Room, Pegasus Books, 
 2017: The Passenger, Pegasus Books,

Awards and nominations 
 1999: Writers' Award, Arts Council of Great Britain, 1999
 2000: New London Writers award, London Arts Board, for Killing Time.
 2005: Mortal Mischief nominated for the Ellis Peters Historical Dagger award.
 2007: Mortal Mischief nominated for the French Quais du Polar prize

References

External links
 

1958 births
Living people
Clinical psychologists
21st-century British writers
Psychology writers
English crime fiction writers
English mystery writers
English horror writers